Michael Muiya (born 1 January 1975 in Nairobi) is a Kenyan professional light/light welter/welterweight boxer of the 1990s and 2000s who won the Kenya welterweight title, and Commonwealth lightweight title, and was a challenger for the Kenya light welterweight title against Kevin Onyango, his professional fighting weight varied from , i.e. lightweight to , i.e. light welterweight.

References

External links

1975 births
Lightweight boxers
Light-welterweight boxers
Welterweight boxers
Sportspeople from Nairobi
Living people
Kenyan male boxers